Aberystwyth Rugby Football Club is a rugby union team from the town of Aberystwyth, West Wales. The club is a member of the Welsh Rugby Union and a feeder club for the Scarlets regional side.

Rugby had been played in Aberystwyth since the late 19th century when the local college founded a rugby team. Aberystwyth Rugby Club was founded in 1947 and the first game was against an Aberystwyth College second team. The club gained membership of the Welsh Rugby Union in May, 1954 which allowed future competitive matches. The team's clubhouse was founded with help of a ten-year interest-free loan from the WRU in 1960. This original clubhouse burned down and was reconstructed in the 1970s.

References

Bibliography

External links
Official site

Rugby clubs established in 1947
Welsh rugby union teams
Sport in Aberystwyth